The Education Act 1980 was an Act of Parliament relating to education in England and Wales. The Act gave local authorities greater autonomy, and had a large effect on the lives of children.

Passage through Parliament 
The Education Bill referred to education in England, Wales and Scotland. The Education Bill received its second reading on 5 November 1989. In mid-February 1980, the Bill was in the Report Stage, and passing through the House of Lords in late February 1980, and the Committee Stage in the second week of March 1980. The House of Lords sat late into the evening on Monday 10 March and Tuesday 11 March 1980, with 299 amendments. The Third Reading of the Bill was passed on Monday, 31 March 1980.

Effects of the Act

School meals
The Act abandoned the compulsion of proper meals being served in education. The NAHT believed that children being allowed to bring in snack food for lunchtime, instead of being given appropriate meals, would be unsuitable for their health. The NAHT threatened that its headteachers could ban snack food.

Caroline Walker, a nutritionist and food campaigner said that - left to their own devices, many children will buy sugary and/or fatty foods for lunch. In many cases, that would largely happen.

References

External links
  1980 Act contents

1980 in education
April 1980 events in the United Kingdom
Food policy in the United Kingdom
Government-provided school meals in the United Kingdom
Education
1980